Escadron de Transport 2/64 Anjou is a French Air and Space Force squadron located at Évreux-Fauville Air Base, Eure, France which operates the Transall C-160R.

See also

 List of French Air and Space Force aircraft squadrons

References

French Air and Space Force squadrons